International Achievement may refer to:
Juno International Achievement Award
New Zealand Music Award for International Achievement